Mihail Kendighelean (born 4 October 1941) is a Gagauz politician in the Republic of Moldova.

Biography 

He was born on October 4, 1941 in Congaz in what is now the Gagauz Autonomous Territorial Unit.

In 1990 he was head of the Gagauz Supreme Soviet and along with President Stepan Topal led the Gagauz areas in a declaration of independence from Moldova. Gagauzia was functionally independent from Moldava until 1994. After negotiations it gained regional autonomy. From 1999 to 2002 Kendighelean was Chairman of the People's Assembly of Gagauzia.

References

Gagauz people
People from Gagauzia
Gagauzia conflict
Moldovan MPs 1990–1994
1941 births
Living people